Clarks Fork Creek, also called Clarks Fork or Sand Creek, is a stream in Harding County, South Dakota, United States. It is a tributary of Grand River.

Clarks Fork Creek was named after Dorr Clark, a local rancher who established the headquarters of a cattle outfit about one mile northeast of the mouth of the stream.

Variant names
According to the Geographic Names Information System, it has also been known historically as: 
Clark's Fork
Clarks Forks Creek
Sand Creek

See also
List of rivers of South Dakota

References

Rivers of Harding County, South Dakota
Rivers of South Dakota